Beitar Pardes Hanna is an Israeli football club based in Pardes Hanna-Karkur. The club currently plays in Liga Gimel Samaria division.

History
The club was founded in 1955 and joined Liga Gimel, the fourth tier of Israeli football at the time.

Beitar have played its entire history in the lower divisions of Israeli football, mostly in Liga Gimel. However, in the 2005–06 season, the club won Liga Gimel Sharon division and were promoted to Liga Bet, the fifth tier at the time. After finished 13th of Liga Bet South A division in the 2006–07 season, Beitar finished the following season at the 15th and second bottom place, and thus dropped back to Liga Gimel, where they play today, at the Samaria division.

Honours

League

External links
Beitar Pardes Hanna The Israel Football Association

References

Pardes Hanna
Pardes Hanna
Association football clubs established in 1955
1955 establishments in Israel